KRPL (1400 AM) is a radio station broadcasting a sports format. Located in Moscow, Idaho, United States, the station serves the Pullman-Moscow area.  The station became an ESPN affiliate on April 4, 2011.  The station is currently owned by KRPL, Incorporated.

KRPL has a deep history of being an important Top 40 radio station in the 1960s and 1970s.  The station employed great future radio talent such as Larry Lujack, who went on to success in the Chicago market at WLS and WCFL.  The station also employed Beau Roberts, (known then as Paul Roberts), who became a major voiceover talent and KZOK Seattle personality. In addition, Brian McKay and Tom Walker in the late 70's moved on to Seattle radio stations.

Moscow, Idaho is located in the Palouse region.

References

External links

RPL
Mass media in Moscow, Idaho